= Carcellia =

Scientific classification
- Domain: Eukaryota
- Kingdom: Animalia
- Phylum: Arthropoda
- Class: Insecta
- Order: Diptera
- Family: Tachinidae
- Genus: Carcellia

Genus of flies

Carcellia is a genus of bristle flies in the family Tachinidae. There are about 12 described species in Carcellia.

== Species ==
These 12 species belong to the genus Carcellia:

- Carcellia caspica (Baranov, 1934)^{c g}
- Carcellia confundens (Rondani, 1859)^{c g}
- Carcellia dumetorum (Macquart, 1850)^{c}
- Carcellia intermedia (Herting, 1960)^{c g}
- Carcellia lena (Richter, 1980)^{c g}
- Carcellia nudicauda (Mesnil, 1967)^{c g}
- Carcellia opiter (Walker, 1849)^{c g}
- Carcellia orientalis (Shima, 1968)^{c g}
- Carcellia pilosa Baranov, 1931^{c g}
- Carcellia pollinosa Mesnil, 1941^{c g}
- Carcellia scutellaris Robineau-Desvoidy, 1830^{c g}
- Carcellia susurrans (Rondani, 1859)^{c g}

Data sources: i = ITIS, c = Catalogue of Life, g = GBIF, b = Bugguide.net
